James George Currie (November 24, 1827 – December 8, 1901) was speaker of the Legislature of Ontario from December 21, 1871 to March 29, 1873 and served as Liberal MLA for Welland from 1871 to 1879.  His standing committee service included those for Private Bills, Railways, Privileges and Elections, and Standing Orders.

Currie was born in Toronto in 1827. He studied law and was called to the bar in 1853. He was county warden and mayor of St. Catharines from 1859 to 1863. In 1862, he was elected to the Legislative Council of the Province of Canada representing Niagara district in a by-election after the death of William Hamilton Merritt. He was a member of the Liberal Party of Ontario. Currie also served as Lieutenant-Colonel in the local militia. Currie ran unsuccessfully for the Niagara seat in the Ontario assembly in 1867. He served as St. Catharines mayor again from 1869 to 1870. He was elected to the provincial assembly in 1871 and became speaker in December of that year after Richard William Scott was named to cabinet. He resigned as speaker on March 29, 1873. In November 1873, he was named an agent at St. Catharines for the Canadian Department of Justice.

In 1877 and 1878, it was reported that he had misappropriated funds from his clients. Currie was defeated when he ran for reelection in 1879.

He died December 8, 1901.

References

Speakers of the Legislative Assembly of Ontario
Members of the Legislative Council of the Province of Canada
Mayors of St. Catharines
1827 births
1901 deaths
Ontario Liberal Party MPPs